Hephaestus could be:
 Hephaestus, a Greek god

 Hephaestion, a Macedonian nobleman and general
 Hephaestus (album)
 Hephaestus (Marvel Comics)
 Hephaestus, a cosmic entity in DC Comics
 Hephaestus, Egypt, a town in Roman Egypt known only from ecclesiastical sources
 Hephaestus, the eighth level of the video game BioShock
 Hephaestus, a role playing game
 Hephaestus, an album released by the band Iceburn
 Hephaestus, battleship of the Royal Hellenic Navy during World War II
 MT Hephaestus, oil tanker wreck in Malta
 Hephaestus, an American alternative metal band.
 Hephaestus (fish) a genus of fish
 2212 Hephaistos, an asteroid and a near-Earth object